County of Neipperg was a county of southeastern Baden-Württemberg, Germany. Barony of Neipperg-Schwaigern was created in 1520 as a baronial partition of the Barony of Neipperg, It was renamed from Neipperg-Schwaigern in 1726, and raised to a county in 1766. Neipperg was mediatised to the Kingdom of Württemberg in 1806.

Counts of Neipperg (1726–1806) 
 Wilhelm Reinhard (1726-1774)
 Leopold (1774-1792)
 Joseph (1792-1806)

References 

1726 establishments in the Holy Roman Empire
Counties of the Holy Roman Empire